Parker Barn, or Farmhouse or Farm or variations may refer to:
Parker Farmhouse (Cazenovia, New York), listed on the National Register of Historic Places (NRHP)
Parker 13-Sided Barn, Jefferson, New York, NRHP-listed
Parker Training Academy Dutch Barn, Red Hook, New York, NRHP-listed

See also
Parker House (disambiguation)
Parker School (disambiguation)
Parker Building (disambiguation)